Heiligenhaus is a town in the district of Mettmann, in North Rhine-Westphalia, Germany, in the suburban Rhine-Ruhr area.  It lies between Düsseldorf and Essen.

Bochum University of Applied Sciences (Hochschule Bochum, formerly Fachhochschule Bochum) has a branch in Heiligenhaus for the development of locking Systems.

Heiligenhaus also contains the ancestral family farm of the acclaimed American author John Steinbeck.

Twin towns – sister cities

Heiligenhaus is twinned with:
 Basildon, England, United Kingdom
 Mansfield, England, United Kingdom
 Meaux, France
 Zwönitz, Germany

References

External links

Towns in North Rhine-Westphalia
Mettmann (district)